Chaldean Syrian Higher Secondary School is an English language secondary school in Thrissur, Kerala, India. It was established in 1927.  The school's current principal is Dr. Aby Paul.

History
Following his arrival in India, the Mar Abimalek Timotheus Metropolitan began establishing schools. Within one year of his arrival in February 1908, he established a school in the parish of Mar Thoma Shleeha Church, Pattikad. (That school was handed over to the government and is still in operation.) After litigation in the community which ended in April 1925, Mar Abimalek Timotheus Metropolitan started five schools in 1927. The Chaldean Syrian school is one of the five.

Curriculum
Subjects offered for science: physics, chemistry, biology, math, computer science and Malayalam/Hindi.
Subjects offered for commerce: accounting, business studies, economics, math, and Malayalam/Hindi.

The NCERT syllabus is strictly followed in all subjects.

Notable alumni
 Rebecca Santhosh, Malayalam Film Actress

External links
 Chaldean Syrian Higher Secondary School

References

High schools and secondary schools in Kerala
Christian schools in Kerala
Schools in Thrissur
Educational institutions established in 1927
1927 establishments in India